Mbweni, Dar es Salaam is an administrative ward in the Kinondoni district of the Dar es Salaam Region of Tanzania. According to the 2002 census, the ward has a total population of 3,475.

See also
Historic Swahili Settlements

References

Swahili people
Swahili city-states
Swahili culture
Kinondoni District
Wards of Dar es Salaam Region